Betulina is a genus of fungi within the Hyaloscyphaceae family. The genus contains 2 species.

References

External links
Betulina at Index Fungorum

Hyaloscyphaceae